The Trumpet Blows is a 1934 American Pre-Code film directed by Stephen Roberts, featuring George Raft as a Mexican matador, Adolphe Menjou as a retired bandito clearly based on Pancho Villa, and Frances Drake as Chulita, the woman they both want to marry.

The film was written by Bartlett Cormack and Wallace Smith, and directed by Stephen Roberts.

The film was a box office disappointment.

Plot

Cast

Production
Helen Twelvetreees was originally announced as female lead.

References

External links

Review of film at Variety

1934 films
Films directed by Stephen Roberts
1934 drama films
Films set in Mexico
American drama films
American black-and-white films
1930s English-language films
1930s American films